Marina Yevgenyevna Kumysh (born December 27, 1964 in Moscow, Russia) is a former Soviet competitive volleyball player and Olympic gold medalist.

References

External links
 Marina Kumysh biography and Olympic results, from https://www.sports-reference.com/; retrieved 2010-12-11.

Soviet women's volleyball players
Olympic volleyball players of the Soviet Union
Volleyball players at the 1988 Summer Olympics
Olympic gold medalists for the Soviet Union
1964 births
Sportspeople from Moscow
Living people
Russian women's volleyball players
Olympic medalists in volleyball
Crimean Karaites
Medalists at the 1988 Summer Olympics